Manorcunningham, or Manor (meaning "the manor of Fort Cownyngham") is a small village and townland in County Donegal, Ireland. It is located 7 kilometers from Letterkenny on the main road to Derry. It is known locally and throughout Donegal as just Manor.

Currently housing development is ongoing and quickly becoming a place to live and commute to the major towns such as Letterkenny.

History
Before the Plantation of Ulster, Mannorcunningham was part of the townland of Magheramore (historically spelt as Machrimore and Maghrimore).

Transport
Manorcunningham railway station opened on 30 June 1883, closed for passenger traffic on 3 June 1940, and finally closed altogether on 10 August 1953.

Amenities
The Local Community Resource Centre hosts a number of local community groups under the umbrella organisation called Manorcunningham Community Development Ltd. often referred to as MCDA, who run the Community Resource Centre. The facility has a computer suite, with broadband access, and hosts Fitness, boxing, parent & toddler group, women's group, historical society, festival committee, Lagan Harps Football Club, Irish & old time dancing, and community youth projects.

In 2007 the centre held their first Community Festival in over 22 years and now plan to hold an annual event.

MCDA are also developing plans for the wider village, inclusive of health natters, outreach services, and infrastructure.

There are two local shops, takeaway, post office and a hairdressers in the village. Religious services are held in both the Church of Ireland  and Presbyterian Churches, with the Roman Catholic services held in the local Catholic church located on the outskirts of the village.

A regular Lough Swilly bus service once ran through the village towards either Letterkenny or Derry until 2014 when the company ceased trading.  Bus Éireann took over the route, however their bus service only stops on the main N13 road adjacent to the village, with no buses from Bus Éireann travelling through the main village from 2014 onwards. A new dedicated covered bus shelter was built at the main road junction with the village.

Transport is also available via Gallaghers Coach Company, who run a service between Annagry and Belfast via Derry, and which will stop in Manorcunningham at request.

People
 Major General Sir James Murray Irwin, doctor in the British Army
 Erminda Rentoul Esler, novelist

See also
 List of populated places in Ireland

References

https://web.archive.org/web/20101127020626/http://www.loughswillybusco.com/timetables/

Towns and villages in County Donegal
Townlands of County Donegal